Spirotropis is the scientific name of two genera of organisms and may refer to:

Spirotropis (gastropod), a genus of gastropods in the family Drilliidae
Spirotropis (plant), a genus of plants in the family Fabaceae